Spruce Valley may refer to:
Spruce Valley, Alberta
Spruce Valley Township, Marshall County, Minnesota
Spruce Valley, West Virginia